Canadian National Railways Depot or Baudette Depot is a former railway station for the Canadian National Railway.

References

Buildings and structures in Lake of the Woods County, Minnesota
Canadian National Railway stations
Railway stations in the United States opened in 1923
Railway stations on the National Register of Historic Places in Minnesota
Former railway stations in Minnesota
National Register of Historic Places in Lake of the Woods County, Minnesota